Tilar J. Mazzeo is an American-Canadian cultural historian, wine writer, and author of several bestselling works of narrative nonfiction. She was the Clara C. Piper Associate Professor of English at Colby College in Maine from 2004-2019.  she is Professeure Associée in the Département de Littératures et Langues du Monde at the Université de Montréal in Canada.

Personal life
Mazzeo, a U.S.-Canadian dual national, is married to Dr. Robert Miles, a Canadian professor of English. Mazzeo lives in Saanichton, British Columbia. From 2015-2021 she was the winemaker and proprietor at Parsell Vineyards. She holds a post-graduate certificate in winemaking from the University of California at Davis and an advanced certificate in Wine and Spirits from the WSET. She teaches courses in the wine industry for business and management at the university level on Vancouver Island.

Career
Mazzeo has held previous teaching appointments at the University of Wisconsin, Oregon State University, and the University of Washington. She was the Jenny McKeon Moore Writer in Residence in the Creative Writing and English program at George Washington University from 2010-2011. She was the Washington Scholar at Pembroke College, Cambridge, the UK in the late 1990s.  She was the editor of digital scholarly editions at Romantic Circles from 2005-2019 and has been featured as a preeminent teacher of creative/narrative nonfiction with the Teaching Company / Great Courses.

In 2006 she released her book Plagiarism and Literary Property in the Romantic Period. It was described by Charles McGrath of the New York Times as "smart and insightful and points out that eighteenth-century writers took a certain amount of borrowing for granted. What mattered was whether you were sneaky about it and, even more important, whether you improved upon what you took, by weaving it seamlessly into your own text and adding some new context or insight."

Her 2008 book The Widow Clicquot is a biography of Barbe-Nicole Clicquot Ponsardin, the eponymous founder of the champagne house Veuve Clicquot. The book was published in by HarperCollins. It became a New York Times bestseller. A film adaption of the book was announced by Variety to be directed by Taylor Hackford.

In 2010 Mazzeo's book The Secret of Chanel No. 5: The Biography of a Scent. was published.

In 2014 Mazzeo's book, The Hotel on Place Vendôme, the story of the Ritz Hotel in Paris during Nazi occupation, was released.  It became a New York Times bestseller in travel writing and was a Los Angeles Times bestseller for more than 20 weeks.

In 2016 Mazzeo published Irena's Children, the story of Polish social worker Irena Sendler, whose efforts prevented the death of thousands of Jewish children during World War II. The book was the winner of the 2018 Western Canada Jewish Book Award.

In 2018, Mazzeo published a biography of Eliza Hamilton, the wife of American Founding Father, Alexander Hamilton, with Simon & Schuster / Gallery.

In 2022, Mazzeo published a non-fiction book based on the history of the "Ciano Diaries." Sisters in Resistance recounts the history of three women who helped to save evidence of German war crimes and passed them to the Allies for use at Nuremberg. Kirkus Reviews wrote that "Mazzeo’s probing book delves intriguingly into the “moral thicket” into which a group of strangers found themselves plunged during the long, dark days of World War II."

Mazzeo's work as a wine writer has appeared in numerous national outlets in the United States, including Food and Wine magazine, Mental Floss, and in the wine guides of which she is the author The Back Lane Wineries of Napa and The Back 
Lane Wineries of Sonoma (Ten Speed Press).

References

Cultural historians
Colby College faculty
People from Port Charlotte, Florida
People from Rockport, Maine
20th-century births
Living people
Year of birth missing (living people)